Hashemi Jegham (Arabic: الهاشمي جغام), born on 1 November 1937 in Sousse is a Tunisian lawyer and human rights activist.

Biography 
He finished his primary and secondary schools in Sousse. In 1957 and graduated from Sadiki College. Hashemi obtained a bachelor's degree in 1961 and further a law degree  in Tunis and also in Paris. He finished the Graduate School of Public Law in 1974 and was called to the bar the same year.

Very active from an early age, he presided over the Jeunesse scolaire from 1955 to 1956 and seated as a member of the Administrative Commission of the Tunisian General Labour Union in 1955. He was also editor-in-chief of the newspaper L'Étudiant tunisien between 1957 and 1959.

During his years of studies in Paris, he founded in 1963, with Ahmed Smaoui, Mohamed Charfi Mohamed Mahfoud, Khemais Chammari, Hassen Ouardani, Abdelhamid Mezghenni and Noureddine Ben Kheder, Socialist Study and Action Group in Tunisia. This group publishes a journal titled Perspectives, then Perspectives tunisiennes.

With Noureddine Ben Kheder and Mahmoud Ben Romdhane, he was a founding member of the Arab Center for the independence of the judiciary (Cairo) in 1990 and vice-president of the Tunisian Center for the Independence of Justice and Lawyers. He has chaired the Higher Committee on Human Rights since 2011.

Private life 
Hachemi Jegham is married and has two children.

References

1937 births
Living people
20th-century Tunisian lawyers
Jegham
Alumni of Sadiki College
People from Sousse
21st-century Tunisian lawyers